The list of ship launches in 1872 includes a chronological list of some ships launched in 1872.


References

1872
Ship launches